3 Faced Elva is Taiwanese Mandopop artist Elva Hsiao's ninth Mandarin studio album. It was released on 15 June 2008 by EMI Music Taiwan and her first album since returning to EMI Music Taiwan. It was available for pre-order from 2 June 2008.

A further three editions were released, 3 Faced Elva (Self Edition) (3面夏娃 自主版) on 27 June 2008., 3 Faced Elva (Brave Edition) (3面夏娃 勇敢版) on 17 July 2008. and 3 Faced Elva (MV Collectible Edition) (3面夏娃 影音珍藏版) on 25 July 2008.

The tracks, "I'll Be There" won one of the Songs of the Year at the 2008 Metro Radio Mandarin Music Awards presented by Hong Kong radio station Metro Info.

Track listing
 "I'll Be There" – Puma theme song
 "衝動" Chong Dong (Impulse)
 "兩個人的寂寞" Liang Ge Ren De Ji Mo (Both Lonely)
 "More More More"
 "時光隧道" Shi Guang Sui Dao (Time Tunnel)
 "速配程度" Su Pei Cheng Du (Match degree)
 "之後" Zhi Hou (Hereafter)
 "Baby Girl"
 "Hey Girl"
 "類似愛情" Lei Si Ai Qing (Similar to Love)
 "暫停戀愛" Zan Ting Lian Ai (Pulses of Love)
 "你看不見的地方" Ni Kan Bu Jian De Di Fang (Places You Can't See)

References

External links
  Elva Hsiao@Gold Typhoon Taiwan formerly EMI Music Taiwan

2008 albums
Elva Hsiao albums
Gold Typhoon Taiwan albums